WLXA (98.3 FM) is a radio station broadcasting a country music format, simulcasting WLLX 97.5 FM Lawrenceburg, TN. Licensed to Loretto, Tennessee, United States, the station is currently owned by Roger Wright through licensee Radio 7 Media, LLC, and features programming from Westwood One.

Previous logos

References

External links

Country radio stations in the United States
LXA
Lawrence County, Tennessee
Radio stations established in 1970
1970 establishments in Tennessee